The 2016 Winmau World Masters was a major tournament on the BDO/WDF calendar for 2016. It took place from 1–4 December at the Lakeside Country Club, which hosted the stage element of the event for the first time.

Glen Durrant maintained the men's title whilst Trina Gulliver won her sixth women's World Masters.

Men's

Seeds
Seeding was take place in accordance of the BDO rankings for end of October 2016. The players was seeded in fifth round.

Draw (last 32 onwards)

Women's Draw
Last 8 onwards.

Boy's draw
Last 8 onwards.

Girl's draw
Last 4 onwards

References

World Masters
World Masters
World Masters (darts)